The C.D. Version of the First Two Records (released on cassette as The Tape Version of the First Two Records) is a compilation by punk rock band Bikini Kill, collecting their 1992 eponymous EP and their half of the 1993 EP Yeah Yeah Yeah Yeah, an album they shared with the band Huggy Bear. It was released in 1994 on Kill Rock Stars and was the first Bikini Kill release on CD. The album was re-released by Bikini Kill Records on June 23, 2015 as simply The First Two Records and featured additional tracks from the expanded re-release of Yeah Yeah Yeah Yeah.

Critical reception 

In its review, AllMusic suggests that the album and its "even noisier follow-up, Pussy Whipped, might be all the Bikini Kill one needs". Characterizing the compilation as "[a]ggressive, lippy, and none-too-disciplined", Rough Guides reviewer Owen James noted that it "nonetheless managed to sound like a triumph of female bonding against the odds". Rolling Stone described it as "caustic, daring, and shamelessly didactic, a two-by-four to the chops of patriarchy".

Track listing

Re-release expanded tracks

Personnel

Performance 
 Kathleen Hanna – vocals
 Billy Karren – guitar
 Tobi Vail – drums, vocals
 Kathi Wilcox – bass guitar

Production 
 Pat Graham — photography
 Tim Green — engineer
 Ian MacKaye — engineer
 Patrick Maley — engineer
 Don Zientara — engineer

References 

Bikini Kill albums
1994 compilation albums
Kill Rock Stars compilation albums